Jewel Geyser is a fountain geyser in the Upper Geyser Basin of Yellowstone National Park in the United States. It is in the Biscuit Basin complex that includes Black Diamond Pool, Black Opal Spring, Wall Pool, Sapphire Pool, Shell Spring, Silver Globe Spring, Avoca Spring, West Geyser, the Mustard Springs, Coral Geyser, and Black Pearl Geyser.

Originally named Soda Geyser by the Hayden Survey, but it was renamed to Jewel Geyser by Arnold Hague in 1887. Jewel Geyser is known for having a shiny, beaded sinter around its vent and erupting frequently.

References

Geothermal features of Yellowstone National Park
Geysers of Wyoming
Geothermal features of Teton County, Wyoming
Geysers of Teton County, Wyoming